Werner von Strucker is a fictional character appearing in American comic books published by Marvel Comics.

The character has seen a live-action adaptation in the Marvel Cinematic Universe TV series Agents of S.H.I.E.L.D. portrayed by Spencer Treat Clark in the third and fifth seasons.

Publication history
Werner von Strucker first appeared in Nick Fury, Agent of S.H.I.E.L.D. Vol. 2 #1 and was created by Bob Harras.

Fictional character biography
Werner von Strucker is the oldest son of Baron Wolfgang von Strucker and the half-brother of twins Fenris (Andrea von Strucker and Andreas von Strucker).

Werner briefly takes over Hydra during one of his father's supposed deaths. Later Wolfgang returns from the dead via the Death Spore virus. Werner uses his influence to try to gain part of the territory of the Kingpin after he falls from power. The conference that would divide up the Kingpin's territory is set in Las Vegas.

At first, Werner's forces detain two spies, who were in reality Microchip and Mickey Fondozzi, two associates of the Punisher. They claim to be Four and Eight, members of the organization called the Secret Empire, one of Werner's fellow conference attendees. Not wanting to risk a rift with the Empire, Werner thus declines to kill them. Via a spy, the Empire learns of the two prisoners. Coincidentally, the real Four and Eight had not shown up for the Kingpin division meeting. The Secret Empire becomes convinced that Four and Eight have turned traitor. They send Chainsaw and his Praetorians, a motorcycle gang, to attack the entire group.

Werner survives the attack. He attends a later meeting of the criminal organizations, assisted by a brown-haired man. This assistant is really his father Baron Strucker. The meeting descends into violence, part of it resulting from Werner's siblings believing that he is not a worthy successor to their father. After the meeting breaks up, Baron Strucker slays Werner via the Death Spore virus and steps into power once again. Werner's corpse is found by a super-powered vigilante named Terror. The vigilante steals one of Werner's eyes in order to gain information about the recent criminal meetings.

In other media
 Werner von Strucker made an appearance in the 1998 film Nick Fury: Agent of Shield, played by Scott Heindl.
 Werner von Strucker appears throughout the third and fifth seasons of Agents of S.H.I.E.L.D., portrayed by Spencer Treat Clark. Following his father's death at the hands of Ultron in Avengers: Age of Ultron, Werner changes his name to Alexander Braun and uses his inheritance to host lavish parties. He is greeted by Grant Ward who convinces him to join Hydra and continue his father's legacy. Strucker confronts Andrew Garner in order to kill him, but is unable to after Garner transforms into the Inhuman Lash and kills the Hydra operatives with him. For his failure to kill Garner, Ward has Kebo beat Strucker until he is left in a comatose state. Eventually S.H.I.E.L.D. acquires Strucker's body, whose condition had gone from comatose to vegetative, in order for Phil Coulson to use the Theta Brain-Wave Frequency Machine on him in order to get information regarding the location of Gideon Malick. Strucker is kept in a mental hospital to recover while suffering the side-effects of the Brain-Wave Frequency Machine and once again using his "Alexander Braun" alias. He is taken by General Hale and her daughter Ruby, both of whom he had known when he was younger, before the doctors can lobotomize him. There was a reference that Ruby once got injured the last time they interacted where Baron Strucker held Werner accountable and beat him up in front of them. Despite some reluctance to work with General Hale, Werner is convinced by Ruby to join their cause when he sees that General Hale is making use of one of his father's experiments in the form of Carl Creel lifting weights. Strucker begins work on translating and rewriting his father's work for Hydra and is further motivated by Ruby so that she can become the "Destroyer of Worlds". Though there had been some delays as Strucker was never taught the German language by his father. After completing his task of translating his father's notes, Strucker teams up with Ruby who overthrow Hale and go searching for the device to transform Ruby. They run into Leo Fitz and Jemma Simmons and hold them at gunpoint to help fix the machine. Afterwards, Ruby becomes infused with 8% of the Gravitonium (containing the remnants of Franklin Hall and Ian Quinn), but fails to control her new powers as she accidentally crushes Strucker's skull, killing him instantly.

References

External links
 Werner von Strucker at Marvel Wiki
 Werner von Strucker at Comic Vine

Characters created by Bob Harras
Comics characters introduced in 1992
Fictional Baltic-German people
Fictional business executives
Hydra (comics) agents
Marvel Comics supervillains
Marvel Comics television characters